My Brother is the biography of Muhammad Ali Jinnah, the founder of Pakistan, by his sister Fatima Jinnah. It is thought that the publication of Hector Bolitho's book, Jinnah Creator of Pakistan, in 1954 prompted her to write about her brother as it was felt that Bolitho's book had failed to bring out the political aspects of her brother's life. It was published by the Quaid-i-Azam Academy in 1987.

The book focused on his political aspirations and how his failing health affected them. The Daily Times summarised it as "...he was aware of the peril his failing health posed, thus wanted to do whatever he could to build the new country whose existence was precarious owing to lack of resources and enormous challenges on the economic and political fronts." It explores his feelings of betrayal in old age and sickness, for example, when picked up by an ambulance when struggling to breathe, it ran out of fuel, and he then lay in wait for an hour for another to come.

References

External links
Read Online
 

Pakistani biographies
Books about Muhammad Ali Jinnah
Fatima Jinnah